Respect is a 1967 album by the American jazz organist Jimmy Smith.

On the Billboard albums chart, Respect peaked at number 60 on the Billboard 200,  at 3 on the top R&B albums chart and at 5 on the top Jazz albums chart.

Reception

Billboard magazine chose Respect as one of their 'Jazz Spotlight' albums for their 30 September 1967 issue and commented that:

AllMusic's review by Scott Yanow stated that Smith:

Track listing
 "Mercy, Mercy, Mercy" (Joe Zawinul) – 6:30
 "Respect" (Otis Redding) – 2:12
 "Funky Broadway" (Arlester "Dyke" Christian) – 6:39
 "T-Bone Steak" (Jimmy Smith) – 7:24
 "Get Out of My Life Woman" (Allen Toussaint) – 8:50

Personnel

Musicians
 Jimmy Smith – organ
 Eric Gale – guitar
 Thornel Schwartz – guitar
 Bob Bushnell – double bass
 Ron Carter – double bass
 Bernard "Pretty" Purdie – drums
 Grady Tate – drums

Technical
 Creed Taylor – producer
 Rudy Van Gelder – engineer
 Val Valentin – director of engineering
 Jack Anesh – cover design
 Irv Elkin – cover photography
 A. B. Spellman – liner notes

Chart performance

Album

References

1967 albums
Jimmy Smith (musician) albums
Albums produced by Creed Taylor
Albums recorded at Van Gelder Studio
Verve Records albums